Sagedia is a genus of lichen-forming fungi belonging to the family Megasporaceae.

The species of this genus are found in Northern Hemisphere.

Species

Species:

Sagedia alpina 
Sagedia augustana 
Sagedia ferruginosa 
Sagedia macrospora 
Sagedia mastrucata 
Sagedia nunatakkorum 
Sagedia simoensis 
Sagedia tenebricosa 
Sagedia umbonata 
Sagedia werneri 
Sagedia werwaestii 
Sagedia zonata

References

Pertusariales
Lichen genera
Taxa described in 1809
Pertusariales genera
Taxa named by Erik Acharius